María Florencia Quiñones (born 26 August 1986) is an Argentine futsal player and former footballer who played as a midfielder.

Club career
Quiñones has played for FC Barcelona in Spain's Primera División.

International career
Quiñones defended Argentina, such as at the 2007 World Cup and the 2008 Summer Olympics.

References

External links

1986 births
Living people
Sportspeople from Córdoba Province, Argentina
Argentine women's footballers
Women's association football midfielders
Primera División (women) players
FC Barcelona Femení players
Boca Juniors (women) footballers
Argentina women's international footballers
2007 FIFA Women's World Cup players
Footballers at the 2008 Summer Olympics
Olympic footballers of Argentina
Competitors at the 2014 South American Games
South American Games gold medalists for Argentina
South American Games medalists in football
Argentine expatriate women's footballers
Argentine expatriate sportspeople in Spain
Expatriate women's footballers in Spain
Argentine women's futsal players